North Shore Australia Football Club, known informally as the North Shore Bombers is an Australian rules football club competing in the Sydney AFL Premier League and based out of the Sydney suburb of St Leonards, New South Wales. Formed in 1903 it remains one of only three foundation clubs still in existence and generally recognised as one of the more successful clubs of Sydney AFL. The club's current home ground is Mortgage Choice Oval (also known as Gore Hill Oval) in St. Leonards, next to the Royal North Shore Hospital. Gore Hill Oval was redeveloped in 2018 and re-opened in 2019; and is believed to be the first or second senior AFL ground to have a synthetic surface.

Previously nicknamed the Bears, the club has the same playing strip and now logo as the Essendon Football Club in the AFL.
In 2021, the Men's Senior coach is Lloyd Perris and the Women's Senior coach is Locky Pryor. The club's president is John Goode.
The club fields 14 teams in the Sydney AFL league. The seniors compete in the Premier Division; the reserves are in the Premier Division Reserves. Under AFL Sydney's revised divisional structure, North Shore will field their third grade team in Division One, their fourths in Division Two, fifths in Division Three and sixths in Division Four.
The Under 19s compete in the top Division One competition, in which they have appeared in four Grand Finals in a row from 2014 to 2017, winning premierships in 2015 and 2016; and in 2021 will defend their 2020 premiership. They also field a team in the Under 19s Division Two competition.
North Shore fielded a Women's team for the first time in 2017, playing in the Women's Division One competition. Growth in the numbers of players in women's footy has seen the club nominate a second women's team in 2018, a third in 2019 and five teams in 2020 and 2021; with the Bombers promoted to Women's Premier Division.

History
The club formed in 1903, one of only three remaining foundation clubs, and since then has won thirteen senior premierships. The Bombers competed in 6 Grand Finals in a row from 2000 to 2005, winning premierships in 2001, 2004 & 2005. Although the Bombers failed to qualify for the finals in 2006, they bounced back in 2007 to take their 13th premiership.
In 2008, after a slow start to the season, the Bombers finished strongly to qualify for the final five, but were eliminated in the first finals match. They failed to qualify for the finals in 2009, but finished fifth in 2010 and fourth in 2011, 2012 and 2013. After missing the finals in 2014 and 2015; they have made the finals in every season since 2016, finishing in the top 2 after the home and away rounds in each season.

With strong junior numbers coming through the ranks, from 2006 to 2008 North Shore fielded two teams in the Under 18s Premier Cup, Sydney AFL's strongest under-18s competition. One of their teams, the Bombers, took out the premiership in 2006 and 2008; while their other team, the Wildcats, took out the 2007 title undefeated. In 2008, the Wildcats changed their name to the Bears. However, the introduction of a divisional structure in the Sydney AFL competition, with a limit of one team per club in each division, saw North Shore only field one under 18s team from 2009 onwards.
Strong player numbers coming through the junior pathway saw the club field a second Under 19s team in the Division Two competition from 2016.

North Shore have always fielded seniors and reserves teams. With solid growth in player numbers, a third open-age team was entered in 2011; competing in Division Three under the league's divisional structure. The thirds team was relegated after its first season, and now competes in Division Four. Continued growth in numbers saw a fourth open-age team entered in Division Five in 2014 and a fifth team in 2018.

Senior premierships: 1904, 1910, 1921, 1952, 1961, 1978, 1979, 1985, 1991, 2001, 2004, 2005, 2007.

Reserve premierships: 1912, 1913, 1950, 1976, 1977, 1981, 1982, 1987, 1988, 1989, 1990, 1993, 1998, 2000, 2001, 2003, 2004, 2017.

Division 1 premierships: 2017.

U19/U18 premierships: 1978, 1979, 1980, 1981, 1984, 1986, 1987, 1988, 1991, 2006, 2007(Undefeated Premiers), 2008, 2009, 2015, 2016, 2020.

The mighty Division 3A men's took home the bread in 2019 under coach Craig Tidemann.

On 4/9/2022 Gordon Smith became the youngest person (28 years 111 days) in North Shore history to win premierships as both a Player (2019 Division 3 Men's) and a Coach (2022 Division 3 Women's)

Premierships

Premier Division

Premier Division Reserves

Men's Division 1

Women's Division Three

Under 18/19

Under 19s Division Two

Division 3(A)

Past Players
The club has produced AFL players such as Ryan Davis, Russell Morris, Lewis Roberts-Thomson, Henry Playfair, Phil Bradmore, Andrew Bomford, Simon Davies, Michael Byrne and Will Sierakowski. Former North Shore Bombers Sam Naismith and Callum Mills are currently playing for the Sydney Swans. Luke Parks is currently listed at Carlton.
The club has also had a number of players admitted onto senior club rookie lists with Ed Clarke, Tom Hill and Mark Livy all listed with the Sydney Swans at one point throughout their careers. Most recently Callum Mills was drafted with the third pick in the 2015 AFL Draft when the Sydney Swans matched Melbourne Demons bid on Mills.

Tennis champion Pat Rafter played a number of games for the reserves in 2004.

Barry Breen, who kicked the winning behind for St Kilda in their 1966 premiership, would go on to coach North Shore to a premiership in 1985.

External links

 
 Full Points Footy Profile for North Shore Bombers

Australian rules football clubs in Sydney
1903 establishments in Australia
Australian rules football clubs established in 1903